WWE is an American professional wrestling promotion based in Stamford, Connecticut. WWE personnel consists of professional wrestlers, managers, play-by-play and color commentators, ring announcers, interviewers, referees, trainers, producers, script writers, and various other positions. Executives and board members are also listed.

Overview 
As of 2021, WWE employs over 800 full-time employees as part of its business operations, as well as contracting with various vendors and service providers. WWE describes their performers as "independent contractors", with contracts for performers typically ranging from short developmental to multi-year deals.

Brands 
Since the reintroduction of WWE's brand extension in 2016, performers are assigned to one of two primary "main roster" brands – Raw and SmackDown.

A third brand – NXT – had originally been designated as a developmental brand for the main roster. In 2019 it was elevated to the third main roster brand. But in 2021, the brand's weekly television show was rebooted as "NXT 2.0", and was the brand was reinstated to its original status as the developmental division for the main roster (Raw and SmackDown).

Main roster performers primarily appear on Monday Night Raw and Friday Night SmackDown, while developmental wrestlers appear on NXT, and its supplemental show NXT: Level Up. 

Also Main Event - while primarily a Raw brand supplemental show - also periodically features NXT wrestlers as well. 

Performers may also appear on WWE's other weekly television programming, as well as pay-per-views, and on untelevised live events.

Personnel in WWE's developmental system are additionally assigned to train at the Performance Center in Orlando, Florida. UK-based developmental wrestlers train at the UK Performance Center in London, England.

Championships 
The brands have their own distinct championships, but some select titles are shared among various brands, such as the WWE Women's Tag Team Championship.  And while maintaining their individual lineages, as of 2022, the WWE and Universal Championships have been defended jointly on both brands as the Undisputed WWE Universal Championship, as have the Raw and SmackDown Tag Team Championships as the Undisputed WWE Tag Team Championship.

McMahon family 

The McMahon family are the principal owners of WWE.

Main roster

Raw

Men's division

Women's division

Other on-air personnel

SmackDown

Men's division

Women's division

Other on-air personnel

Developmental roster

NXT

Men's division

Women's division

Other on-air personnel

Unassigned

Performance Center trainees

Men's division

Women's division

Referees

Broadcast team 
The following section pertains to announcers who cover WWE broadcasts. This group includes backstage interviewers, presenters, ringside commentators, ring announcers, pre-show hosts, and analysts.

Raw

SmackDown

NXT

Other

Ambassadors 

Select former or retired WWE wrestlers not currently on the main roster (sometimes billed as "WWE Legends") and other celebrities and personalities have contracts to make periodic appearances—either on WWE TV or for promotional events—serving as "ambassadors" (public representatives/spokespeople) for the company.

Creative team

Producers

Music department

Performance Center staff 

Note: as NXT is based at the Performance Center, PC coaches and trainers also work as producers for that brand.

Medical team

Corporate staff

Board of Directors

Senior management

Notes

See also 
 List of current champions in WWE
 List of former WWE personnel
 List of professional wrestling rosters

References

External links 
 WWE roster at WWE.com

WWE personnel
Personnel